Leonardo Loria (born 28 March 1999) is an Italian footballer who plays as a goalkeeper for  club Frosinone on loan from Pisa.

Club career
On 28 June 2020, he agreed on a 4-year contract with Pisa.

On 20 July 2021, he joined Monopoli on loan. On 29 July 2022, Loria was loaned to Frosinone, with an option to buy.

Career statistics

Club

Notes

Honours 
Juventus U23
 Coppa Italia Serie C: 2019–20

References

1999 births
Living people
Italian footballers
People from Erice
Footballers from Sicily
Association football goalkeepers
Serie B players
Serie C players
Reggina 1914 players
Juventus F.C. players
Juventus Next Gen players
Pisa S.C. players
S.S. Monopoli 1966 players
Frosinone Calcio players
Italy youth international footballers